The Intermediate League World Series Asia–Pacific Region is one of six International regions that currently sends teams to the World Series in Livermore, California. The region's participation in the ILWS dates back to 2013.

Asia–Pacific Region Countries

Region Champions
As of the 2022 Intermediate League World Series.

Results by Country
As of the 2022 Intermediate League World Series.

See also
Asia-Pacific Region in other Little League divisions
Little League — Far East
Asia-Pacific & Middle East
Japan
Junior League
Senior League
Big League

References

Intermediate League World Series
Asia-Pacific